Rio Dyer (born 21 December 1999) is a Welsh professional rugby union player who primarily plays wing for Dragons in the United Rugby Championship. He has also represented Wales at international level, having made his test debut against New Zealand during the 2022 Autumn Internationals.

Club career
Dyer began his career playing for the Risca RFC and Pill Harriers RFC youth sides, as well as for Newport High School Old Boys RFC.

While part of the Dragons Academy, Dyer made his professional debut on 27 January 2018, against the Saracens in the Anglo-Welsh Cup. His first appearance in the Pro14 came against Benetton Rugby the following month.

Dyer was named man of the match on 4 January 2020, as the Dragons beat regional rivals Ospreys 25–18, Dyer scoring a try in the victory.

On 23 October 2022, Dyer again claimed a man of the match award against the Ospreys, scoring twice and propelling the Dragons to a 32–25 win.

International career
Dyer was a Wales U20 international. He missed the 2019 Six Nations Under 20s Championship to participate in the World Rugby Sevens Series, but rejoined the U20 side for the 2019 World Rugby Under 20 Championship.

On 18 October 2022, Dyer was named in the Wales squad for the 2022 Autumn series. Dyer started against New Zealand on 5 November 2022, and scored the first try for Wales.

Dyer scored his second try for Wales in the final match of the series, a loss against Australia.

Owing to his continued good form, Dyer continued his involvement with the national side, being named in the Welsh squad for the 2023 Six Nations Championship. Dyer started the first two matches against Ireland and Scotland, but was dropped for the match against England, following Louis Rees-Zammit returning to fitness. 

Recalled to the starting team against Italy, he scored his third try for Wales, and secured his first win for the national side. The following week Dyer scored again, against France, securing a try bonus point for Wales as they avoided a wooden spoon finish.

International tries

References

External links

Dragons profile
WRU profile

1999 births
Living people
Dragons RFC players
Rugby union players from Newport, Wales
Welsh rugby union players
Rugby union wings
Wales international rugby union players
People educated at Bassaleg School